Milo Vasić (born 1 November 1954), better known as Jasmin Stavros, is a Croatian pop musician. He was born in Split in a family of Romanian descent. One of his most popular songs remains "Dao bih sto Amerika" (I Would Give a Hundred Americas), which relates to his time spent in the United States before his return to Croatia shortly before the country's independence, which peaked at number two on the Yugoslav national charts, and it was later re-recorded in 2015 as a remix version with the help of Croatian DJ Podra. He is signed to Hit Records.

Discography 
1987 – Priče iz kavane
1988 – Evo mene opet
1989 – Ljubio sam anđela
1991 – Prijatelji
1993 – E moj čovječe
1995 – Dijamanti
1997 – Zrak, zemlja zrak
1998 – Evo puta mog
2000 – Jutrima
2002 – Vučja vremena
2004 – Krećem ponovo
2007 – Nemoj se udavati
2013 – Ljubomorni ljudi

References

External links
 
 Jasmin Stavros at Discogs
 Jasmin Stavros Videos

1954 births
Living people
Croatian pop singers
20th-century Croatian male singers
Musicians from Split, Croatia
21st-century Croatian male singers

Croatian people of Romanian descent